Michael "Mike Machine" Mallais (born in Miramichi, New Brunswick on November 23, 1979) is a Canadian drummer. He started playing improvised drums at the age of two and subsequently a real kit at the age of five after being introduced to heavy metal bands. In 2007 Mike won the "World's Fastest Drummer" competition, "Battle of the Feet" category.  Michael played his last show with Jeremy Reid & The Machine on Feb. 28, 2013.  His current band is named Mosquito and plays out of Langley, British Columbia.

World's Fastest Drummer

Awards
The 2005 Maritime WFD Champion - Halifax, Nova Scotia, Canada,
The 2006 Canadian WFD Champion - Quebec City, Quebec, Canada,
The 2007 WFD Winter World Finals Battle of the Feet Champ – Anaheim, California,
The World's Fastest Drummer (Battle of the Feet category),

Statistics
1,034 single strokes (60 seconds)
4,595 single strokes (5 minutes)
13,309 single strokes (15 minutes)

References

External links
Official website
Mike Mallais official blog
Profile at extremesportdrumming
Mike Mallais on YouTube

Canadian male drummers
Musicians from New Brunswick
Living people
People from Miramichi, New Brunswick
1979 births
21st-century Canadian drummers
21st-century Canadian male musicians